Frank Keen Nieass (25 October 1886 – 28 August 1967) was an Australian politician. He was a Labor member of the South Australian House of Assembly, representing East Torrens from 1930 to 1933 and Norwood from 1938 to 1941 and from 1944 to 1947. He was a long-serving secretary of the Australian Government Workers Association.

References

 

1886 births
1967 deaths
Members of the South Australian House of Assembly
Place of birth missing
Australian Labor Party members of the Parliament of South Australia
20th-century Australian politicians